Antaeotricha incompleta is a moth in the family Depressariidae. It was described by Edward Meyrick in 1932. It is found in Mexico.

References

Moths described in 1932
incompleta
Taxa named by Edward Meyrick
Moths of Central America